The Women's 200m Backstroke at the 2007 World Aquatics Championships took place on 30 March (prelims & semifinals) and the evening of 31 March (finals) at the Rod Laver Arena in Melbourne, Australia. 59 swimmers were entered in the event, of which 56 swam.

Existing records at the start of the event were:
World Record (WR):  2:06.62, Krisztina Egerszegi (Hungary), 25 August 1991 in Athens, Greece.
Championship Record (CR): 2:07.40, HE Cihong (China), Rome 1994 (11 September 1994)

Results

Finals

Semifinals

Preliminaries

References

Women's 200m Backstroke Preliminary results from the 2007 World Championships. Published by OmegaTiming.com (official timer of the '07 Worlds); Retrieved 2009-07-11.
Women's 200m Backstroke Semifinals results from the 2007 World Championships. Published by OmegaTiming.com (official timer of the '07 Worlds); Retrieved 2009-07-11.
Women's 200m Backstroke Final results from the 2007 World Championships. Published by OmegaTiming.com (official timer of the '07 Worlds); Retrieved 2009-07-11.

Swimming at the 2007 World Aquatics Championships
2007 in women's swimming